Lakeland County was a municipal district in northern Alberta, Canada. It existed for just over nine years from 1998 to 2007.

History 
Lakeland County was originally formed as a municipal district on July 1, 1998 through the separation of lands from the Municipal District of Bonnyville No. 87. These lands included the Alberta portion of the Cold Lake Air Weapons Range. On May 1, 2002, Lakeland County absorbed Plamondon after it dissolved from village status. Just over five years later on August 1, 2007, Lakeland County and the Town of Lac La Biche amalgamated with each other to form a new municipal district named Lac La Biche County.

Demographics 
In the 2011 Census, the dissolved Lakeland County had a population of 5,882 living in 2,060 of its 2,850 total dwellings, a −7.6% change from its 2006 population of 6,365.

In the 2001 Census, Lakeland County had a population of 4,959, a 2.4% increase from its 1996 population of 4,842. Its 2001 population was subsequently adjusted to 5,306 to reflect the 2002 dissolution of the Village of Plamondon, which had a population of 347 in 2001.

See also 
List of communities in Alberta
List of municipal districts in Alberta

References

External links 
 

1998 establishments in Alberta
2007 disestablishments in Alberta
Former municipal districts in Alberta
Lac La Biche County